The Unimog 421 is a vehicle of the Mercedes-Benz Unimog series, made by Daimler-Benz. In total, 18,995 units of the Unimog 421 were built from 1966 to 1989 in the Mercedes-Benz Gaggenau plant. It is a medium-sized vehicle bigger than the traditional Unimog 411, but smaller than the Unimog 406. Introduction of new heavy models and Unimog 411 production ceasing in the mid-1970s changed the Unimog 421's role in the Unimog lineup; it became the predecessor of the light Unimog series and thus succeeded the Unimog 411.

Both short and long wheelbase versions, as well as "front half only" OEM part versions, were made. Technically, the Unimog 421 is based on the Unimog 406 and Unimog 411. The plane ladder frame and axles are Unimog 411 parts, and the engines used for the 421-series are also passenger car engines. Cab and gearbox are Unimog 406-related. The 421 closed cab version looks almost exactly like a 406-series cab, but the cabrio version is a bit more narrow and "squat". A 406-series can be differentiated from a 421-series by the position of the air-intake: A 421-series has the air-intake on the right-hand side of the bonnet, and a 406-series on the left-hand side.

In Argentina, a copy of the Unimog 421, the 431-series, was produced under licence. From 1969 to 1971, 601 cabrios and 152 closed cab units of the Unimog 431 were made. Daimler-Benz produced CKD-kits in Gaggenau, which were then shipped to Argentina for manufacture. The 431-series was fitted with a  engine, but has the short wheelbase – this combination was not available for the original 421-series.

Engines 

The 421-series was made with straight-four precombustion chamber Diesel engines. Prototypes included, four different engines were used, which are all passenger car engines.

Types of the 421-series 
In total 20 different types of the 421-series were made, out of which four were made as OEM parts for other manufacturers.

Mercedes-Benz types

Types made for third party manufacturers 
Several Unimog 421 types were custom-made as OEM parts for third party manufacturers.

Technical specifications

Gallery

References

External links 

Historical Daimler-Benz commercial video on YouTube; 9:39 min

Tractors
Mercedes-Benz trucks
Vehicles introduced in 1966